Jack Milne (born 10 February 2003) is a Scottish professional footballer who plays for Kelty Hearts, on loan from Scottish Premiership side Aberdeen. He has also played for Brechin City. Milne who was originally a central midfielder, then a holding midfielder, has now successfully been converted into a central defender.

Career
Jack attended the SFA Performance School at Hazlehead Academy and the Youth Academy at Under 12s, aged 11 years old and was rewarded with full time contract in the summer of 2020. Born in Aberdeen, he played one year at Under 18s, before being loaned out to Highland League side Brechin City for first half of the 2021/22 campaign. He also impressed whilst playing for the Aberdeen B team in the SPFL Trust Trophy games. He made his senior debut in a League Cup Group Stage match against Peterhead. On 1 October 2022, he made his League debut for Aberdeen coming on as a second-half substitute in a 4–1 win against Kilmarnock.

On 12 January 2023, Milne joined Scottish League One club Kelty Hearts on loan until the end of the season.

References

2003 births
Living people
Scottish footballers
Aberdeen F.C. players
Brechin City F.C. players
Kelty Hearts F.C. players
Scottish Professional Football League players
Association football midfielders